Aymeric Luc (born 14 October 1997) is a French rugby union player, who plays for RC Toulon.

He was first called to the French national senior team by Fabien Galthié on the 26 October 2021, for the autumn internationals, after Virimi Vakatawa was ruled-out through injury.

References

External links
 

1997 births
Living people
French rugby union players
RC Toulonnais players
Rugby union fullbacks
Rugby union wings
Rugby union fly-halves